The Norwegian Society of Composers was founded in 1917. The Society's main objectives are to promote its members' music and secure their rights.

As of today the Society counts 185 members who meet regularly for discussions and seminars. The Society works towards creating opportunities for the dissemination of contemporary music and for increasing public awareness of this art form. Contemporary music is promoted via several channels, including the society's record label Aurora, and through collaboration with concert producers and festivals.

The Society negotiates on behalf of its members in matters concerning remuneration and performing rights. It acts in an advisory capacity to the Ministry of Culture and Church Affairs and is represented on several boards (such as the Norwegian performing rights organization TONO) and public committees. The Norwegian Society of Composers offers legal, financial and practical aid to its members and provides information for the general public.

Together with its sister organizations in the Nordic countries, the Norwegian Society of Composers arranges the annual festival Nordic Music Days.

Awards

Work of the Year Winners 
 Rune Rebne (1995)

External links
 

1917 establishments in Norway
Arts organizations established in 1917
Music organisations based in Norway
Norwaco